Erigeron leucoglossus is an Asian species of flowering plants in the family Asteraceae. It grows in alpine grasslands in Tibet.

Erigeron leucoglossus is a perennial, clump-forming herb up to 35 cm (14 inches) tall, forming woody underground rhizomes. Its flower heads have white ray florets surrounding yellow disc florets.

References

leucoglossus
Flora of Tibet
Plants described in 1973